Socialist Labor Party or Socialist Labour Party may refer to:

 German Socialist Labour Party of Poland
 German Socialist Labour Party in Poland – Left
 Gibraltar Socialist Labour Party
 Independent Socialist Labour Party, Poland
 Industrial Socialist Labor Party, Australia
 Luxembourg Socialist Workers' Party
 Revolutionary Socialist Labor Party, United States
 Socialist Labor Party of America
 Socialist Labor Party (Australia)
 Socialist Labour Party (Canada)
 Socialist Labour Party (Egypt)
 Socialist Labour Party (Ireland)
 Socialist Labour Party (UK)
 Socialist Labour Party (UK, 1903)
 Socialist Labour Party of Croatia
 Socialist Labour Party of Greece
 Socialist Labour Party of Yugoslavia (Communists)

See also
 Socialist Labor Party Hall in Vermont, United States
 Socialist Party (disambiguation)